Rebbachisaurinae is a subfamily within the family Rebbachisauridae, defined to include Rebbachisaurus garasbae and exclude Limaysaurus tessonei. It was first proposed as a rank by Jose Bonaparte in 1995, to include Rebbachisaurus. Some phylogenies however, include Rebbachisaurus in a clade with Limaysaurus, and thus the subfamily was not used. In 2015, a phylogenetic analysis was conducted, and it found Rebbachisaurus instead to be closer to Nigersaurus and related genera than Limaysaurus, and thus was used to replace Nigersaurinae as Rebbachisaurinae is the older term and is named after the genus used for the formation of the family Rebbachisauridae. The 2015 cladogram of Fanti et al. is shown below.

References

Rebbachisaurids
Cretaceous dinosaurs
Tetrapod subfamilies